Christian Johnson (born October 17, 1986) is a former American football offensive lineman. He played college football at the University of Kentucky and attended West Potomac High School in Alexandria, Virginia. He was a member of the Dallas Vigilantes, Philadelphia Soul and Arizona Cardinals.

Professional career

Dallas Vigilantes
Johnson played for the Dallas Vigilantes of the Arena Football League (AFL) during the 2011 season.

Philadelphia Soul
Johnson was assigned to the Philadelphia Soul of the AFL on October 25, 2011. The Soul advanced to ArenaBowl XXV in 2012 and ArenaBowl XXVI in 2013, losing to the Arizona Rattlers both times. Johnson was named First-team All-Arena in 2013.

Arizona Cardinals
Johnson was signed by the Arizona Cardinals of the National Football League on January 7, 2014 and placed on the Philadelphia Soul's Other League Exempt list. He was released by the Cardinals on June 9, 2014.

Philadelphia Soul
Johnson returned to the Philadelphia  Soul on June 19, 2014.

References

External links
Just Sports Stats
Arena Football League profile
Philadelphia Soul bio

Living people
1986 births
American football offensive linemen
African-American players of American football
Kentucky Wildcats football players
Dallas Vigilantes players
Philadelphia Soul players
Arizona Cardinals players
Players of American football from Virginia
Sportspeople from Alexandria, Virginia
21st-century African-American sportspeople
20th-century African-American people